The 52nd Massachusetts General Court, consisting of the Massachusetts Senate and the Massachusetts House of Representatives, met in 1831 during the governorship of Levi Lincoln Jr. Leverett Saltonstall served as president of the Senate and William B. Calhoun served as speaker of the House.

Notable legislation included "a law to transfer state elections to the fall so as to coincide with national elections."

Senators

Representatives

See also
 22nd United States Congress
 List of Massachusetts General Courts

References

External links
 
 

Political history of Massachusetts
Massachusetts legislative sessions
massachusetts
1831 in Massachusetts